Bachelor Peak is a summit in Burnet County, Texas, in the United States.

Two versions of the origin of the name exist, but both involve groups of bachelors visiting the mountain.

References

Landforms of Burnet County, Texas
Mountains of Texas